

Calling formats
+996 XXX XXXXXX  for calls from outside Kyrgyzstan
0XXX XXXXXX  or 0XXXX XXXXX for calls within Kyrgyzstan.

The NSN length is nine digits.

National Numbering Plan (NNP) of the Kyrgyz Republic

References

Kyrgyzstan
Kyrgyzstan communications-related lists